Egg frog may refer to amphibians in two distinct genera:

Animal common name disambiguation pages